The Crime of Dr. Forbes is a 1936 American crime film directed by George Marshall and starring Gloria Stuart, Robert Kent and Henry Armetta.

The film's art direction was by Duncan Cramer.

This film was shot at 20th Century Fox Studios, Los Angeles, CA and Tombstone, Arizona.

Partial cast
 Gloria Stuart as Ellen Godfrey  
 Robert Kent as Dr. Michael Forbes  
 Henry Armetta as Luigi  
 J. Edward Bromberg as Dr. Eric Godfrey  
 Sara Haden as Dr. Anna Burkhart  
 Alan Dinehart as Prosecuting Attorney  
 Charles Lane as Defense Attorney 
 DeWitt Jennings as Judge Benson  
 Taylor Holmes as Dr. Robert Empey  
 Paul Stanton as Dr. John Creighton  
 Russell Simpson as Sheriff Neil  
 Paul McVey as John Dunlap  
 Charles Croker-King as Dean Lewis

References

Bibliography
 James Monaco. The Encyclopedia of Film. Perigee Books, 1991.

External links
 

1936 films
1936 crime films
1930s English-language films
American crime films
Films directed by George Marshall
20th Century Fox films
American black-and-white films
Films scored by Samuel Kaylin
1930s American films